is the Japanese word for miracle. It may also refer to:

Songs
"Kiseki" (BeForU song)
"Kiseki" (BoA song)
"Kiseki" (Greeeen song)
"Kiseki" (Kumi Koda song)

Other
Kiseki (film), a Japanese film
Kiseki (Shugo Chara!), a character in the manga series Shugo Chara!
Kiseki Films, a former anime company
 Kiseki, known as Trails outside of Japan, a video game franchise